Pharmacogenomics is a peer-reviewed medical journal established in 2000 and published by Future Medicine. The editors-in-chief are David Gurwitz (Tel-Aviv University), Howard McLeod (University of North Carolina at Chapel Hill), and Munir Pirmohamed (University of Liverpool). The journal covers the field of pharmacogenomics.

Abstracting and indexing 
The journal is abstracted and indexed in Biological Abstracts, BIOSIS Previews, Biotechnology Citation Index, Chemical Abstracts, Current Contents/Life Sciences, EMBASE/Excerpta Medica, Index Medicus/MEDLINE/PubMed, Science Citation Index, and Scopus. According to the Journal Citation Reports, the journal has a 2016 impact factor of 2.350, ranking it 132nd out of 256 journals in the category "Pharmacology & Pharmacy".

References

External links 
 

English-language journals
Pharmacology journals
Genetics journals
Publications established in 2000
Future Science Group academic journals